Carolyn McKecuen is President of the Take Our Daughters And Sons To Work Foundation.
She supported Take our Daughters to the Polls as a non-partisan initiative.
She is founder and director of Watermark, a member-owned craft cooperative.

Awards
Presidential Award for Public/Private Support in Microenterprise, by the Ms. Foundation
1994 MacArthur Fellows Program

References

External links
"Do children and business trips mix?", msnbc.com, Harriet Baskas
Talented women, Jocelyne Etienne-Nugue, UNESCO Publishing, 1995, 

MacArthur Fellows
Living people
Year of birth missing (living people)